E127 may refer to:
 E127 series, a Japanese train type
 Erythrosine, a food additive
 Ikarus E127, a Hungarian low-floor suburban bus
 European route E127 in Siberia and Kazakhstan
 Element 127, unbiseptium, a predicted chemical element; see Extended periodic table § Superactinides